The South Tyrone Hospital is a local hospital in Dungannon, County Tyrone, Northern Ireland. It is managed by the Southern Health and Social Care Trust.

History
The hospital has its origins in the Dungannon Union Workhouse and Infirmary which was designed by George Wilkinson and opened in 1842. A fever hospital was added in 1846. The infirmary evolved to become South Tyrone Hospital and a red brick tower block was erected on the site in the 1960s.

References

Southern Health and Social Care Trust
Health and Social Care (Northern Ireland) hospitals
Hospitals in County Tyrone